Boris Alexandrovich Khmelnitsky (born on 27 June 1940 in Ussuriysk, died on 16 February 2008 in Moscow) was a Russian theatre and movie actor.

Biography
He worked many years in the Taganka Theatre in Moscow. In cinema, he was known for many of his roles in Soviet adventure films. He played Robin Hood, Prince Igor, Captain Grant and many other characters. The last film he participated in was the 2008 film about Taras Bulba by Vladimir Bortko.

Played Robin Hood in 1976 film Robin H
ood's Arrows and 1983 film Ballad of valiant knight Ivanhoe.

He married Marianna Vertinskaya in 1975. They were divorced in 1981; they had one child from this marriage - Darya Khmelnitskaya.
He died on 16 February 2008 of cancer.

Partial filmography 

 War and Peace (1966) as Minor Role (uncredited)
 Kto vernyotsa, dolyubit (1968) as Poet
 Sofiya Perovskaya (1968) as Nikolai Kibalchich
 The Eve of Ivan Kupala (1968) as Piotr
 The Red Tent (1969) as Viglieri
 Knyaz Igor (1969) as Prince Igor
 I byl vecher, i bylo utro... (1971) as Vladimir Polevoy
 Naperekor vsemu (1973) as Nikanor
 Poj pesnyu, poet (1973)
 Robin Good's Arrows (1975) as Robin Good
 Svidetelstvo o bednosti (1977) as «Krest»
 Dikaya okhota korolya Stakha (1980)
 V nachale slavnykh del (1980)
 Lisova pisnya. Mavka (1981) as Perelesnik
 Sultan Beybars (1982)
 Ballad of valiant knight Ivanhoe (1983) as Robin Good
 Parol 'Otel Regina''' (1983)
 Chyornaya strela (1985) as Lord Shoreby
 V poiskakh kapitana Granta (1985, TV Mini-Series) as Captain Grant
 Perekhvat (1986)
 Voydite, strazhdushchie! (1988) as Geli
 Priklyucheniya Kventina Dorvarda, strelka korolevskoy gvardii (1988)
 Comedy of Lisistrate (1989)
 Etyudy o Vrubele (1989) as Semyon Gayduk
 Bez nadezhdy nadeyus (1989)
 Tragedy, Rock Style (1990) as Dmitriy Ivanovich's Friend
 Caravan of Death (1992) as Pin
 Ubiystvo v Sunshine Menor (1992) as Joe Alex
 Mest proroka (1993)
 Jonathan of the Bears (1994) as Religious Mercenary
 Vesyolenkaya poyezdka (1994)
 Voyna okonchena. Zabudte... (1997)
 Chernyy prints (2004) as Card Player
 Saga drevnikh bulgar. Skazanie Olgi Svyatoy (2005)
 Taras Bulba'' (2009) as Borodaty (final film role)

Awards
 People's Artist of Russia (2001)

References

External links
 
  Actor Boris Khmelnitsky died, NewsRu.com

1940 births
2008 deaths
People from Ussuriysk
Russian male film actors
Soviet male stage actors
People's Artists of Russia
Soviet male film actors
Deaths from cancer in Russia
Deaths from prostate cancer
Burials at Kuntsevo Cemetery